Funky Divas is the second studio album by American recording group En Vogue, released by Atlantic Records division East West on March 24, 1992 in the United States. Conceived after the success of their Grammy Award–nominated debut album Born to Sing (1990), En Vogue reteamed with their founders Denzil Foster and Thomas McElroy to work on the entire album. As with Born to Sing, the pair borrowed from contemporary R&B, new jack swing, and hip hop, while also incorporating classic soul, blues and doo-wop elements, particularly on its on two Sparkle cover versions, as well as, in the case of "Free Your Mind," heavy metal sounds.

But has since earned retrospective acclaim and recognition from musicians, and producers. Praised for En Vogue's vocal work and the production's definitive character, it is often cited to have paved the way for other female bands such as TLC and Destiny's Child who would emerge in the following years. The album became the quartet's second album to earn a Grammy Award nomination in the Best R&B Performance by a Duo or Group with Vocals category, while winning the American Music Award for Favorite Soul/R&B Album and the Sammy Davis Jr. Award for Entertainer of the Year at the 1993 Soul Train Music Awards.

Funky Divas debuted at number one on the US Billboard Top R&B Albums chart, and at number eight on the Billboard 200, while peaking at number four on the UK Albums Chart. It reached triple platinum status in the US, where it sold 3.5 million copies, becoming the seventh highest-selling R&B albums of the year as well as En Vogue's biggest-selling album to date. The album spawned five singles, including "My Lovin' (You're Never Gonna Get It)", Aretha Franklin cover "Giving Him Something He Can Feel", "Free Your Mind", "Give It Up, Turn It Loose," and "Love Don't Love You."

Critical reception

Funky Divas received generally positive reviews from music critics, but has since earned retrospective acclaim. Parry Gettelman from The Orlando Sentinel complimented Foster & McElroy's production on the album. While somewhat critical with the slower songs, she wrote that "the pair has a knack for both melodies and killer grooves, and they're gifted, playful arrangers." With the performances, Gettelman found that "EnVogue interprets both the McElroy & Foster tracks and three covers with style, verve and a lot of soul." Los Angeles Times writer Connie Johnson that the album was "clearly groomed to offer a '90s slant to The Supremes' classy crossover image, En Vogue lifts ideas from James Brown and Aretha Franklin to create a sharper, more streetwise package." People magazine wrote that "En Vogue succeeds best at light danceable funk embroidered with soaring, swooping vocals. Maybe the album title promises a bit more than what’s delivered. But 'Spunky Hip-Hop Gals Who Can Sing Their Fannies Off' would have been just too long, we guess."

Arion Berger, writing for Entertainment Weekly, felt that Funky Divas "delivers flirtatious R&B set to a mechanized beat [...] The four sweet-voiced members of En Vogue are versatile enough to handle reggae-, gospel- and doo-wop-tinted dance music with game if not very deep enthusiasm. Still, Funky Divas has an awkward charm." In her uneven review for Rolling Stone journalist Danyel Smith wrote that "En Vogue come off, on Funky Divas, as voluptuously voiced and impeccably rehearsed as they did on their 1990 debut, Born to Sing. But the audacious production that outfitted Dawn, Terry, Cindy and Maxine has not found its way to 1992." She felt that "on the debut, the Sixties girl-group allusions were perfect enough to seem accidental, but this time they clunk around obviously and loudly, like there's a fifth woman in an ugly dress singing along with Maxine, Cindy, Dawn and Terry – and she's sadly off-key."

In his retrospective review, AllMusic editor Jose F. Promis wrote that "combining sass, elegance, and class with amazing vocals and perfect production, this delightful set stands as one of the 1990s definitive pop albums." He found that the album "is basically free of filler" and called it the "era's most diverse, dazzling, and exciting pieces of work." In 2011, Rolling Stone magazine ranked the album 60th on its list of the 100 Best Albums of the '90s and second best albums of the 90's by a female group, while Complex magazine listed it 45th on its The 50 Best R&B Albums of the '90s listing in 2017. Complex editor Craig Jenkins stated that while "En Vogue's 1990 debut Born to Sing introduced Cindy, Dawn, Maxine, and Terry's throwback quartet-style harmonies to the world, the 1992 follow-up Funky Divas fashioned it into a weapon." He found that the album paved the way for other female bands such as TLC and Destiny's Child. In 2020, Enio Chiola of PopMatters named it the most "overlooked and underrated" album of the 1990s.

Chart performance
In the United States, Funky Divas debuted at number eight on the Billboard 200 album chart and reached the top spot on Billboards Top R&B/Hip-Hop Albums chart with first week sales of 60,000 units. A major commercial success, it became one of the biggest-selling R&B albums of year, exceeding sales of more than 3.5 million copies domestically.  It was eventually certified triple platinum by the Recording Industry Association of America (RIAA) on March 24, 1993. Billboard ranked Funky Divas  25th on its Billboard 200 year-end chart, while ranking it seventh on the Top R&B Albums year-end chart. As of 2018, it remain En Vogue's highest-peaking album on both charts.

Internationally, Funky Divas reached the top forty of the national album charts in Canada, the Netherlands, New Zealand, and Sweden. A steady seller in Canada, the album eventually was certified platinum by the Canadian Recording Industry Association (CRIA). The album reached its highest peak in the United Kingdom, where it peaked at number four on the UK Albums Chart and reached gold status, indicating sales in excess of 100,000 copies. With a worldwide sales total of 5 million, Funky Divas remains En Vogue's biggest seller within their discography.

Singles
Lead single "My Lovin' (You're Never Gonna Get It)" became an instant hit, peaking at number two on the US Billboard Hot 100 and number 4 on the UK Singles Chart. The accompanying video for "My Lovin'" won two MTV Video Music Awards. The song samples the funk guitar line of James Brown's 1973 song "The Payback" from the album of the same name. Second single "Giving Him Something He Can Feel," a cover of the Aretha Franklin hit from the film Sparkle (1976), also became a top ten hit in the US. Funky Divas third single, the rock-infused "Free Your Mind", became another top ten hit. In the UK, the song made the top 20. The video for "Free Your Mind" won three MTV Video Music Awards in 1993.

By the time the fourth single, "Give It Up, Turn It Loose", was released in late 1992, the Funky Divas album was already certified triple platinum in the US by the RIAA. The single gave the group another UK top 40 hit. The fifth and final single released from Funky Divas was "Love Don't Love You", which was remixed for its release. The video for the single consists of clips from previous En Vogue videos "Giving Him Something He Can Feel", "Free Your Mind", as well as two of their 1990 videos "Lies" and "You Don't Have to Worry". A second edition of the album containing the later hits "Runaway Love" and "Whatta Man" (with Salt-N-Pepa) was released in the UK in 1994. This edition of Funky Divas also includes remixed versions of "Hip Hop Lover", "It Ain't Over Till the Fat Lady Sings", and "Love Don't Love You" (a different remix from the US single release in 1993), along with slightly altered artwork inside the CD booklet.

Track listing

Notes
 denotes additional producer(s)
 denotes additional co-producer(s)

Personnel
Credits are taken from the album's liner notes.

Terry Ellis, Cindy Herron, Maxine Jones, Dawn Robinson – vocals
Denzil Foster, Thomas McElroy – keyboards, drums
Jinx Jones – electric guitar, acoustic guitar, bass
Michael Fellows – drums
Jon Bendich, Juan Escovedo, Peter Michael – percussion
Chuckii Booker – spoken word
Wayne Jackson – rap
Tony George – trumpet
Les Harris – saxophone
Chris Mondt – trombone
Denzil Foster, Thomas McElroy – production, arrangement
Brian Gardner – mastering

Charts

Weekly charts

Year-end charts

Certifications

Release history

References

Notes

See also
List of number-one R&B albums of 1992 (U.S.)

1992 albums
En Vogue albums